"Je t'aime, je t'aime, je t'aime" is a song by French singer Johnny Hallyday from his 1974 studio album Je t'aime, je t'aime, je t'aime. It was also released as a single.

Composition and writing 
The song was written by Michel Mallory and Jean Renard. The recording was produced by Jean Renard.

Commercial performance 
In France the single spent two weeks at no. 1 on the singles sales chart (in June–July 1974).

Track listing 
7" single Philips 6009 510 (1974, France etc.)
 A. "Je t'aime, je t'aime, je t'aime" (4:24)
 B. "Danger d'amour" (3:40)

Charts

References

External links 
 Johnny Hallyday – "Je t'aime, je t'aime, je t'aime" (single) at Discogs

1975 songs
1975 singles
French songs
Johnny Hallyday songs
Philips Records singles
Number-one singles in France
Songs written by Jean Renard (songwriter)
Songs written by Michel Mallory